Tarrud Rural District is in the Central District of Damavand County, Tehran province, Iran. Its capital is Mara. At the National Census of 2006, its population was 5,661 in 1,586 households. There were 5,491 inhabitants in 1,587 households at the following census of 2011. At the most recent census of 2016, the population of the rural district was 6,263 in 1,948 households. The largest of its 34 villages was Mara, with 1,081 people.

References 

Damavand County

Rural Districts of Tehran Province

Populated places in Tehran Province

Populated places in Damavand County